Myinmoletkat is a village of Dawei District in the Taninthayi Division of Myanmar.

Geography
Myinmoletkat is located east of the Ban River on the western side of the Tenasserim Range. 2,072 m high Myinmoletkat Taung, one of the main summits of the Bilauktaung subrange is located 15 km to the southeast of the village.

References 

Populated places in Tanintharyi Region